Bernie McKinnon was a Canadian ice hockey, lacrosse, soccer and tennis coach for St. Lawrence for over 30 years. He was the head coach both men's and women's teams for most sports as well as for freshman teams when varsity status was limited to three years.

Career
Bernie McKinnon arrived at Canton in 1953, playing for the freshman ice hockey team before joining the elite varsity squad for the 1954–55 season. McKinnon helps the Saints to a 19-win season and their second NCAA tournament appearance. After a disappointing 4th place finish McKinnon's Saints found themselves back in the tournament in 1956, narrowly losing in overtime to eventual champion Michigan before soundly defeating Boston College in the consolation game. In his senior season McKinnon was one of three team captains but the squad slumped just enough to be left out of the NCAA tournament. McKinnon returned to St. Lawrence in 1965 as a graduate assistant and was tasked with coaching the freshman ice hockey squad. He eventually added the responsibility of freshman lacrosse coach to his resume before taking over the varsity ice hockey team on an interim basis while head coach George Menard earned an MBA.

When Menard retired in 1971 McKinnon was the natural choice to replace him and while his results weren't poor, McKinnon could not arrest the slide of the men's team that had started in the late 60s. Over five seasons McKinnon could only get the program to post one winning season and resigned as the ice hockey coach in 1976 to focus on the other sports he was tasked with heading. That summer, his women's tennis team recorded an undefeated season, going 33–0. In 1978 coach-of-all-trades McKinnon accepted the head coaching duties of the women's ice hockey team which began sponsoring the varsity program the following year. In 1980 he took over the women's soccer team (promoted to varsity in 1982) and led both until his retirement in 1996. while his ice hockey squads only had moderate success, he was able to get the soccer team to two NCAA tournaments, amassing a record of 138–92–24 in the process.

After his retirement McKinnon received the Joe Burke Award for his contributions to women's ice hockey. and was inducted into the St. Lawrence Athletic Hall of Fame in the same year that he lost his battle with bone cancer.

Career statistics

Head coaching record

Ice hockey

Men's

Women's

Women's Soccer

References

External links

Year of birth unknown
2000 deaths
Canadian ice hockey coaches
Ice hockey people from Nova Scotia
St. Lawrence Saints men's ice hockey players
St. Lawrence Saints men's ice hockey coaches
St. Lawrence Saints women's ice hockey coaches
St. Lawrence Saints men's lacrosse coaches
St. Lawrence Saints women's soccer coaches
St. Lawrence Saints men's tennis coaches
St. Lawrence Saints women's tennis coaches
Sportspeople from Dartmouth, Nova Scotia
Canadian ice hockey forwards
Canadian soccer coaches